The 2014 Dutch Basketball Supercup was the 4th edition of the Dutch Basketball Supercup. The game was played between Donar, the winner of the 2013–14 Dutch Basketball League, and ZZ Leiden, the winner of the 2013–14 NBB Cup.

Match details

References

Dutch Basketball Supercup
Supercup